Christian Backs (born 26 August 1962) is a German former professional footballer who played as a midfielder.

Club career
Backs came through the youth academy of BFC Dynamo and played professionally for BFC Dynamo (later named FC Berlin) for 12 seasons, winning eight East German titles and two cups in the 1980s.

International career
During this time he won nine caps for East Germany, scoring once. He was also involved in the East German Olympic team who qualified for the 1984 Olympics, but was forced to stay at home, because of the East Germans' boycott of the tournament.

Coaching career
After reunification, Backs wound down his career with Reinickendorfer Füchse, where he played from 1992 to 1997. He took over as manager of the 'Foxes' in 2000, where he remained until 2004 when he took the reins at his old club Dynamo. He only lasted a year, however, and after a brief spell at Berliner AK, returned to Reinickendorf, where he remained until 2009. In summer 2009 returning to BFC Dynamo for a second spell as manager and was in March 2010 fired.

Honours
 DDR-Oberliga: 1981, 1982, 1983, 1984, 1985, 1986, 1987, 1988
 FDGB Pokal: 1988, 1989

External links

References

1962 births
Living people
German footballers
Association football midfielders
East German footballers
East Germany international footballers
Berliner FC Dynamo players
SG Bergmann-Borsig players
Füchse Berlin Reinickendorf players
Berliner FC Dynamo managers
German football managers